Quimby the Mouse was created by Chris Ware while he attended the University of Texas at Austin from 1990 to 1991 (some of the strip was written from 1992 to 1993) The strip originally appeared in the student paper, The Daily Texan. 

The strip follows that of a seemingly depressed cartoon mouse, modeled after Felix the Cat and Mickey Mouse. Quimby constantly questions himself and wonders where he fits in. Chris Ware unusually advises readers on the first page to not buy the book, as he considers it to be not up to the same standard as his current work. The type of writing found in the strip is very typical of Ware, and the strip rarely contains a standard punch line.

References

Comics by Chris Ware